is a former Japanese football player.

Playing career
Kanta Kondo played for J2 League club; Ehime FC from 2014 to 2015.

References

External links

1993 births
Living people
Keio University alumni
Association football people from Ehime Prefecture
Japanese footballers
J2 League players
Ehime FC players
Association football midfielders